All My Friends Are Enemies: Early Rarities is a compilation album by the band Say Anything, released on January 22, 2013. It features all their music recorded before the release of their 2004 album ...Is a Real Boy.

Track listing
Most songs recorded and produced by Max Bemis between the years 1999 and 2003, mostly in the Bemis household in Los Angeles California.

Personnel

Say Anything
Max Bemis - all the instruments except where noted
Coby Linder - all live (non-synth) drums
Michael Levin - bass on Junior Varsity, Baseball, "Jessie and My Whetstone" and "Consigliore"
Evan Span - guitar on Junior Varsity and the guitar solo on "All My Friends" from Baseball
Joe Doleman - saxophone on "Ants in My Pants" from Baseball
Michael Auerbach - backup vocals on "Sappy"

Production
Remastered by Ryan Smith at Sterling Sound in New York, NY

References

2013 compilation albums
Say Anything (band) albums
Equal Vision Records compilation albums